George Samuel (died c. 1823) was an English landscape-painter, working in both in oils and watercolours. He was a noted topographical draughtsman of his day.

Life
Samuel exhibited annually at the Royal Academy from 1786 to 1823, and also largely at the British Institution, his works being of the scenery of Cornwall, Westmorland, and other picturesque parts of England. He was a member of Thomas Girtin's sketching society in 1799, and one of the earliest workers in lithography. His death, in or soon after 1823, was accidental, caused by an old wall falling on him while he was sketching.

Works

In 1789 Samuel painted a view of the River Thames from Rotherhithe during the great frost, which attracted attention. His view of Holland House was engraved in William Angus's Select Views of Seats, that of Windsor Castle in William Henry Pyne's Royal Residences; and others in the Copperplate Magazine (1792) and The Itinerant (1799) by the engraver John Walker. His watercolours were influenced by Paul Sandby.

Samuel also made in 1799 the designs for the illustrations to Grove Hill, a poem describing the residence of John Coakley Lettsome, by Thomas Maurice.

Notes

 
Attribution
 

 

Year of birth missing
1820s deaths
English landscape painters
English watercolourists
English landscape artists
18th-century English painters
English male painters
19th-century English painters
19th-century English male artists
18th-century English male artists